Karimu Alhassan (born 30 April 1991) is a Ghanaian footballer playing as a defender who last played for Dire Dawa City.

Career
In 2008, he signed for Hearts of Oak, and later was named as the team captain.

On 6 August 2011, he joined Egyptian side Zamalek on a free transfer. However FIFA (CAS after appeal) ordered Hearts of Oak eligible to receive training compensation from Zamalek for US$30,000.

On 25 August 2012, Alhassan joined Turkish TFF First League side Adana Demirspor on a two-year contract after being released by Egyptian club Zamalek. In summer 2013 he joined South African side Black Leopards F.C.

On January 29, 2014, Alhassan signed a two and a half year contract with Serbian SuperLiga side FK Radnički 1923.  He left Radnički and joined Ghana Premier League side Liberty Professionals F.C. in February 2015.

On November 30, 2015, Liberty Professionals F.C. agreed to loan Karimu Alhassan in a one-year deal to Sudan Premier League side Al-Merrikh SC.

International career
Alhassan was called up for the Ghana national team for a friendly game against Argentina and made his debut in the game on 1 October 2009.

He was part of Ghana U-20 squad at the 2011 African Youth Championship.

Honours
Hearts of Oak
Ghana Premier League: 2008–09

References

External links
 

1991 births
Living people
Footballers from Accra
Ghanaian footballers
Ghana international footballers
Ghanaian expatriate footballers
Association football defenders
Accra Hearts of Oak S.C. players
Zamalek SC players
Expatriate footballers in Egypt
Adana Demirspor footballers
Expatriate footballers in Turkey
Black Leopards F.C. players
Expatriate soccer players in South Africa
FK Radnički 1923 players
Expatriate footballers in Serbia
Ghanaian Muslims
Ghanaian expatriate sportspeople in Egypt
Expatriate footballers in Ethiopia
Dire Dawa City S.C. players